Alojzij Šuštar (14 November 1920 – 29 June 2007) was the Archbishop of Ljubljana from 1980 until 1997. He remained Archbishop Emeritus of the Roman Catholic Archdiocese of Ljubljana after his retirement. He was born in Grmada near Trebnje and died in Ljubljana, where he lived at the St. Stanislaus Institute for the last 10 years of his life.

References

External links
Biography of Archbishop Alojzij Šuštar 

|-

1920 births
2007 deaths
People from the Municipality of Trebnje
20th-century Roman Catholic archbishops in Slovenia
Participants in the Second Vatican Council
Roman Catholic archbishops of Ljubljana
Roman Catholic archbishops in Yugoslavia